The Bishop of Birkenhead is an episcopal title used by a suffragan bishop of the Church of England Diocese of Chester, in the Province of York, England. The title takes its name after Birkenhead, a town located on the Wirral Peninsula.

List of bishops

References

External links
 Crockford's Clerical Directory - Listings

 Birkenhead
Anglican suffragan bishops in the Diocese of Chester
1965 establishments in England